Hamara Ghar may refer to:

 Hamara Ghar (1964 film), a 1964 Hindi social drama film 
 Hamara Ghar (1950 film), a family drama film